Alfred Whitman Agee (November 18, 1850 – October 4, 1938) was the third lieutenant governor of Nebraska, United States, serving from 1883 to 1885 while James W. Dawes was governor.

Agee was born in Morgan County, Tennessee, to Alfred and Catharine A. Agee.  He moved with his parents to Pike County, Indiana, around 1861, as his father was an anti-slavery minister who wanted to move to a free state.  Agee remained in Indiana until 1872.  He spent some time in Illinois and also studied law, and ended up settling in Aurora, Nebraska, in 1874, and was admitted to the bar.  He was elected lieutenant governor in the fall of 1882, and served one two-year term (1883–1885).  He subsequently served in the Nebraska legislature.  He later moved to Utah and practiced law and also served as a judge there.

References

1850 births
1938 deaths
Lieutenant Governors of Nebraska
Nebraska Republicans
People from Morgan County, Tennessee
People from Pike County, Indiana
People from Aurora, Nebraska